Jiří Večerek (4 August 1943 – 14 July 2022) was a Czechoslovak footballer. He competed in the men's tournament at the 1968 Summer Olympics. On a club level he played for Baník Ostrava. Večerek also won two caps for Czechoslovakia national team.

References

External links
 

1943 births
2022 deaths
Czech footballers
Czechoslovak footballers
Czechoslovakia international footballers
Olympic footballers of Czechoslovakia
Footballers at the 1968 Summer Olympics
Sportspeople from Ostrava
Association football defenders
FC Baník Ostrava players
Czechoslovak First League players